Rebecca Honig (born July 3, 1981) is an American voice actress, who works on the properties of 4Kids Entertainment and Central Park Media. She is also credited as Becca, Rebecca Miriam, Rebecca Handler, and Margeaux Hartman.

Filmography

Animation roles
 12 Tiny Christmas Tales - Veggies
 Alien Nine - Additional voices
 Arcade Gamer Fubuki - Ruriko Sakuragasaki
 DNA^2 - Lulara Kawasaki
 Gall Force: New Era - Ruby
 Geobreeders: Breakthrough - Namiko
 Hammerboy - Angdu's Mother
 Ichi the Killer: Episode Zero - Midori
 Mask of Zeguy - Sayaka
 Sonic X - Cream the Rabbit, Cheese the Chao, additional voices
 Tales of Seduction - Sachiko
 Winx Club - Undine
 Urotsukidoji: New Saga - Akemi

Video games
 Sonic the Hedgehog (series) - Cream the Rabbit (2005–2010)
 Sonic Riders (series)
 Sonic Riders
 Sonic Riders: Zero Gravity
 Sonic Rush
 Mario & Sonic at the Olympic Games (series) - Cream the  Rabbit
 Beijing 2008
 Vancouver 2010

Live-action dubbing
 Beautiful Weapon - Woman
 Big Boobs Buster - Eriko, Mom
 Scorpion's Revenge - Yukiko Kida, Additional Voices

References

External links

American video game actresses
American voice actresses
Living people
1981 births
21st-century American women